Polyommatus erotides  is a  butterfly found in the  East Palearctic (Saur, Altai, Siberia , Transbaikalia, Mongolia)  that belongs to the blues family.

Taxonomy
Formerly a subspecies of Polyommatus eros.

Description from Seitz

erotides Styr. (80 d), from the mountains of Southern  Siberia, is a large, blue-green male form, with broad black distal margin to the forewing, into which the deep black veins merge.

Biology
The larva feeds on Fabaceae.

See also
List of butterflies of Russia

References

Polyommatus